Goldirocks is a 2003 Canadian musical comedy film directed by Paula Tiberius, starring Sasha Ormond, Greg LeGros, Laura Kim, Dominick Abrams, Dru Viergever and Megan Dunlop.

Cast
 Sasha Ormond as Goldi
 Greg LeGros as Miles
 Laura Kim as Lil
 Dominick Abrams as Adler
 Dru Viergever as Darby
 Megan Dunlop as Rhonda

Reception
Eddie Cockrell of Variety called the film an "Energetic verisimilitude of snappy music fairytale" that is "undercut by grating in-your-face lead thrush."

Monica S. Kuebler of Exclaim! wrote that while the film "misses several key chords", it "jams with some serious spirit and homespun, low-budget determination."

Geoff Pevere of the Toronto Star wrote that while the film is "marred" by "tentative" performances and Tiberius' "fondness for stock sitcom cuteness", it "knows and loves Goldi's seedy-but-sincere scene and it makes joyful musical noise."

References

External links
 
 

2003 films
Canadian musical comedy films
2000s musical comedy films